Kwai Shing West Estate is one of the 31 constituencies of the Kwai Tsing District Council in Hong Kong. The seat elects one member of the council every four years. It was first created in the 1994 elections. Its boundary is loosely based on part of High Prosperity Terrace, Horizon Place and Kwai Shing West Estate in Kwai Chung with estimated population of 18,062.

Councillors represented

Election results

2010s

References

Constituencies of Hong Kong
Constituencies of Kwai Tsing District Council
1994 establishments in Hong Kong
Constituencies established in 1994
Kwai Chung